The Gila River Indian Community (GRIC) (O'odham language: Keli Akimel Oʼotham, meaning "Gila River People", Maricopa language: Pee-Posh) is an Indian reservation in the U.S. state of Arizona, lying adjacent to the south side of the city of Phoenix, within the Phoenix Metropolitan Area in Pinal and Maricopa counties. Gila River Indian Reservation was established in 1859, and the Gila River Indian Community formally established by Congress in 1939. The community is home for members of both the Akimel O’odham (Pima) and the Pee-Posh (Maricopa) tribes.

It is made up of seven districts along the Gila River and its largest communities are Sacaton, Komatke, Santan, and Blackwater. Tribal administrative offices and departments are located in Sacaton. The Community operates its own telecom company, electric utility, industrial park and healthcare clinic, and publishes a monthly newspaper. It has one of the highest rates of Type 2 diabetes in the world, around 50% of the population.
The community has voluntarily contributed to Type 2 diabetes research, by participating in many studies of the disease.

Government
Under their constitution, tribal members elect a governor and lieutenant governor at-large. They also elect 16 council members, from single-member districts or sub-districts with roughly equal populations.

Officials listing

 Stephen Roe Lewis, Governor
 Robert Stone, Lt. Governor
 Arzie Hogg, Council Member, Dist 1
 Joey Whitman, Council Member, Dist 1
 Carol A. Schurz, Council Member, Dist 2
 Carolyn Williams, Council Member, Dist 3
 Rodney Jackson, Council Member, Dist 3
 Barney B. Enos Jr., Council Member, Dist 4
 Pamela Johnson, Council Member, Dist 4
 Jennifer Allison, Council Member, Dist 4
 Monica Antone, Council Member, Dist 4
 Janice Stewart, Council Member, Dist 5
 Thomas White, Council Member, Dist 5
 Lawrence White, Council Member, Dist 5
 Marlin Dixon, Council Member, Dist 5
 Charles Goldtooth, Council Member, Dist 6
 Anthony Villareal Sr., Council Member, Dist 6
 Terrance Evans, Council Member, Dist 6
 Devin C. Redbird, Council Member, Dist 7

Attractions
The first casino opened in 1994.

Ira H. Hayes Memorial Library

The Ira H. Hayes Memorial Library is located in District 3 in Sacaton, and provides a variety of services to the community.

Current communities

 Bapchule (Pihpchul)
 Blackwater (Chukma Shuhthagi)
 Casa Blanca
 Co-op Village (Chichino)
 Gila Crossing (Kuiva)
 Goodyear (Valin Thak)
 Komatke (Komadk)
 Maricopa Colony
 Sacate Village
 Sacaton (Ge'e Kih)
 Sacaton Flats (Hahshani Kehk)
 St. John's
 Santa Cruz (Hia-t-ab)
 Santan/Santa Ana (Santan)
 Stotonic (S-totonigk)
 Sweetwater (S-iʼovi Shuhthagi)
 Vahki (Va'akih)
 Wet Camp Village

Lone Butte Ranch
Lone Butte Ranch is a populated place situated in the community.

Transportation
The community owns and operates Gila River Memorial Airport, a small, private-use airport, located 4 miles southwest of the central business district of Chandler. It was used for cropdusting and air charter operations, with no scheduled commercial services. The airport is no longer used and is in a state of total abandonment.
The community also operates Gila River Transit, a public transit system serving all seven districts.

I-10 was built through the southeast to north-central portion of Gila River lands, bringing significant highway traffic through the area.

Laws
The Constitution  and  Bylaws  of  the  Gila  River  Indian Community of Arizona was ratified by the tribe January 22, 1960, and approved by the US Secretary of the Interior on March 17, 1960. It is available online.

The current Gila River legal code was enacted in 2009. Amendments enacted 15 May 2013, are available online.

Marriage law
Gila River does not recognize marriages performed elsewhere in the state of Arizona. On 15 July 2015, in response to the Obergefell v. Hodges Supreme Court ruling legalizing same-sex marriage in the United States, the Community Council passed a motion by a vote of 14 to 2 that the gendered language of the Gila River marriage code meant that same-sex marriage was not recognized:

Notable people
 Beulah Archuletta (1909–1969), née Donahue, was Pee-Posh (Maricopa) and an actress.
 Ira Hayes (1923-1955), one of the six Marines depicted in the Raising the Flag on Iwo Jima photograph.
 Jay Morago (1917-2008), served as the first Governor of the Gila River Indian Community from 1954 until 1960 and helped to draft the reservation's 1960 constitution.
 Mary Thomas (1944-2014), was the first woman elected as Governor of the Gila River Indian Community, serving from 1994 until 2000.
 Natalie Diaz (1978-), Pulitzer-prize winning poet, educator, and activist

See also

 Gila River Indian Community Emergency Medical Services
 Salt River Pima-Maricopa Indian Community

References

 Gila River Reservation, Arizona United States Census Bureau

External links
 Gila River Indian Community Website
 Gila River Indian Community Tourist Attractions

 
Apache
Akimel O'odham
Federally recognized tribes in the United States
Gila River
Geography of Maricopa County, Arizona
Geography of Pinal County, Arizona
1859 establishments in the United States
States and territories established in 1859